Mahmood Shaam born Tariq Mahmood on 5 February 1940, is a Pakistani Urdu language journalist, poet, writer and news analyst.

After serving Pakistan's largest newspaper Jang Group for more than 16 years continuously as Group Editor, he joined ARY Digital Group on 21 September 2010 to launch a new Urdu language newspaper. He has written many books on different subjects.

Early life

Mahmood Shaam received his bachelor's degree in English literature, Persian and Philosophy from Government College Jhang in 1962. In 1964, he obtained master's degree in Philosophy from Government College Lahore. He was the editor of the college magazine Ravi at Lahore.

Shaam has visited several countries during his journalistic career including United Kingdom, Singapore, Burma, Denmark, Sri Lanka, Saudi Arabia, Sweden, Malaysia, Switzerland, Syria, Qatar, Egypt, Italy, United Arab Emirates, India and Canada.

Career

As journalist
Mahmood Shaam has worked for almost 45 years as a journalist including 16 years with Jang Group of Newspapers. He has written 20 books including poetry books.

In his journalistic career, he has interviewed many national and international leaders like Yasir Arafat, Zulfiqar Ali Bhutto, Indira Gandhi, Sheikh Mujeeb-ur-Rehman, Gerald Ford, Henry Kissinger, Tun Abdul Razak, Benazir Bhutto, Pervez Musharraf. Khan Abdul Ghaffar Khan, G.M. Syed, Khan Abdul Wali Khan, Maulana Bhashani, Mufti Mahmood, Asghar Khan and Ghulam Mustafa Jatoi.

Designations
He has worked as;

Assistant Editor Qandeel (magazine), Lahore, (1962–1964)

Magazine Editor Daily "Nawa-i-Waqt" Lahore, (1965–1967)

Editor Weekly "Akhbar-e-Jahan" Karachi, (1967–1970) and (1972–1975)

Special Correspondent for Sindh for Daily "Musawat" Lahore, (Jul 1970 – Apr 1972)

Editor/Publisher: Weekly "Mayar" Karachi, (Apr 1976 – 1978) & (1980–1994)

In January 2018, Mahmood Shaam who, for a long time, had edited the Urdu language newspaper Daily Jang returned to work for the Jang Group of Newspapers. He had quit the Jang Group in 2012 to pursue other interests.

Bibliography

Poetry

Aune-paune ghazlein baicheen, nazmaun ka bewpaar kiya
Cardio Spasm (A Long Poem) 1969
Akhri Raqs (Last Dance) 1971
Chehra Chehra Meri Kahani (My Story on Every Face) 1975
Nawishta-e-Dewar (Writings on Wall) 1980
Qurbanion Ka Mausam (The Season of Sacrifices) 1991
Mohallon Mein Sarhadein (Frontiers within Streets) 1999Ayyan Ayyan Yo Yo, Urdu poems for childrenBas ek apne hi qadmon ki chhaap suntan hoonOther booksRoo ba Roo (Face to Face)Larkana Se Peking (Larkana to Peking ) 1972Larkana to Peking 1973Kitna Qareeb Kitna Door (So Near So Far) 1974, A travelogueBhutto Key Akhri Ayyam (The Last Days of Bhutto) 1979Nai Awazen (New Voices) 1987, Interview with emerging leadersBenazir Bhutto – The Way Out 1988Benazir Bhutto – Ek Hi Rasta 1988Bartania Mein Khizaan (The English Autumn) 1992, TravelogueTaqdeer Badalti Taqreerain (Speeches that Changed Destiny) 1993Khawateen-o-Hazraat (Ladies and Gentlemen) 1998Shab-ba-Kher (Good Night) 1999, A political novelRoo ba Roo (Face to Face), New Edition – Interviews from 1967 to 1977One to One, Interviews from 1977 to 2002Bharat Mein Black List (Black Listed in India)Amrica Kia Soch Raha Hai (Urdu), American visit after 9/11Visiting American Mind – English VersionMumlikat Aey Mumlikat  2007Pakistan Per Qurban, The day with Benazir Bhutto (1970 to 2007)Indifference in the time of extremism'' (2017)

Awards and recognition
 Pride of Performance Award by the President of Pakistan in 2010

See also
 List of Pakistani journalists
 List of Pakistani poets
 List of Urdu language poets
 List of Pakistani writers
 List of Urdu language writers

References

External links 
Mahmood Shaam's poetry on YouTube
 
 

1940 births
Living people
Pakistani male journalists
Pakistani newspaper editors
Pakistani poets
Urdu-language poets from Pakistan
Recipients of the Pride of Performance